María S. (Marisol) Soengas (born 1968) is a Spanish immunologist who is a professor at the Spanish National Cancer Research Center (CNIO). Her research considers melanoma and the development of new therapeutic strategies. She was elected to the European Molecular Biology Organization in 2022.

Early life and education 
Soengas was born in Agolada. She was an undergraduate student at the University of A Coruña, and moved to the Autonomous University of Madrid for doctoral research. She worked in molecular biology with M. Salas in the Centro de Biología Molecular Severo Ochoa. She worked as a postdoctoral scholar at the Cold Spring Harbor Laboratory and at the University of Michigan. At the Cold Spring Harbor Laboratory, she characterised the apoptotic factors as melanoma suppressors. After deciding to expand beyond cellular/animal models, Soengas moved to the dermatology department in Michigan, home to the Multidisciplinary Melanoma Clinics.

Research and career 
In 2008, Soengas joined the Spanish National Cancer Research Center (CNIO), where she established a research program that looked to understand melanoma, and to translate cutting-edge scientific research into clinical practice. Sonegas looks to identify new biomarkers of disease, and the mechanisms of cellular stress that are deregulated in melanoma. Her group was the first to describe a lymphoreporter (MetAlert) mice for non-invasive imaging of pre-metastatic niches in melanoma. This allowed her to understand the mechanisms of immune resistance as well as to generate nanoparticle-based treatments.

Awards and honors 
 Dana Ashby Young Investigator Award of the Society for Melanoma Research
 2009 Premio M. Josefa Wonenburger from the Xunta de Galicia
 2013 Melanoma Research Alliance Award
 2016 L’Oreal-MRA Women-Lead Team Award
 2022 Elected to the European Molecular Biology Organization
 2022 Pezcoller-Marina Larcher Fogazzaro-EACR Women in Cancer Research Award

Selected publications

References 

Living people
1968 births
Autonomous University of Madrid alumni
University of A Coruña alumni
Immunologists